Günter Naumann (17 November 1925 – 6 November 2009) was a German actor. He is Best known for his performance in the TV-serials Zur See and Polizeiruf 110.

Selected filmography

References

External links 

1925 births
2009 deaths
German male film actors
German male television actors